is a Japanese musician and composer.

Keiichi Suzuki may also refer to:

, Japanese speed skater
, Japanese racing driver
, Japanese governor of Hiroshima

See also
 Keiichi
 Suzuki (disambiguation)